Capuchin Church was a church of the Capuchins in Maribor in Slovenia. It was built in the 17th century and replaced by the Franciscan Church near the end of the 19th century.

References

Roman Catholic churches in Maribor
Former churches in Slovenia
17th-century Roman Catholic church buildings in Slovenia